The Nucleus for European Modeling of the Ocean (NEMO) is a general model of ocean circulation developed by a European consortium and used in many countries of Europe.

Composition 
NEMO is an ocean modeling platform composed of several models and numerical techniques for the use and processing of incoming and outgoing data. It has five main components:

Ocean: NEMO-OPA (Océan Parallélisé)
Sea ice: NEMO-LIM ("Louvain-la-neuve sea Ice Model")
Biogeochemistry: NEMO-TOP/PISCES ("Tracer in the Ocean Paradigm")
Grid refinement tools: NEMO-AGRIF
Data assimilation system: NEMO-TAM ("Tangent linear and Adjoint Model")

It can be associated with other components of the climatic system, atmosphere and land surface, by means of OASIS.

Grid 
Nemo is available in various configurations.

Global configurations use ORCA tripolar grids, which allow the entire oceanic domain to be covered without singularity points. In fact, the grid formed by the meridians and the parallels has two singularities: the North Pole and the South Pole. Near these two points the mesh size tends to zero, making the use of modeling equations problematic. To overcome the problem, the poles of the ORCA grids are positioned on the terrestrial sphere in such a way as to be located on continents. Since the South Pole is located on the Antarctic continent, a modification of the standard grid is not required, while the North Pole, which is located in the Arctic Ocean, is replaced by two points located one in North America and the other in Siberia. The ORCA grid is available in different horizontal resolutions ranging from about 2 degrees to 1/12 degree.

Development 
The development of NEMO is organized and controlled by a European consortium created in 2008 and formed by:

French National Center for Scientific Research, France
Mercator Ocean, France
Natural Environment Research Council, United Kingdom
Met Office, United Kingdom
Euro-Mediterranean Center on Climate Change, Italy
National Institute of Geophysics and Volcanology, Italy

References

External links 
 www.nemo-ocean.eu

Consortia in Europe
Oceanographic organizations